The State of the Nation is an annual address to Parliament given by the President of the republic of Ghana covering economic, social, and financial state of the country according to Article 67 of the 1992 constitution of Ghana.

History
The state of the nation address, also known as SONA, was first implemented under the administration of John Kufuor. Records show that in 18 years at the helm of Ghana, President Jerry John Rawlings did not deliver a State of the Nation address contrary to the provisions of the national constitution. Former president John Agyekum Kufuor,  was the first president to deliver the state of the nation address in Ghana hence sticking rigidly to the letter of the constitution, which says the president should give a State of the Nation address at the beginning and close of every parliamentary session. Since then The state of the nation has been in existence.

Timeline of speeches

See also
State of the Union Address in the United States
Speeches by heads of state

References

External links
 The Official Parliament of Ghana Website

Politics of Ghana
Government of Ghana
Speeches by heads of state